Aija Edwards is an American curler from Seattle, Washington. She is a two-time women's national champion (1980, 1987) and a former senior women's national champion (2009).

Teams

Personal life
Her sister-in-law Joan Fish is also a curler, they are teammates on US and World women's and seniors championships.

References

External links

Living people
American female curlers
American curling champions
Sportspeople from Seattle
Year of birth missing (living people)
Place of birth missing (living people)